Originally, a café-théâtre was a small room in a café or a cabaret, or even the café or cabaret itself, where people would put on spectacles. These spectacles were mostly unconventional or of limited means, and could range from ordinary theatrical presentations to singing tours, and even improvisational theatre.  

Bernard Da Costa created the first Parisian café-théâtre in 1966 at the Royal Café.
Derek Woodward created a touring Theatre Company called 'Cafe Theatre' in the mid 1980s. It was a Dinner Theatre ensemble that rivalled  British Airways Playhouse productions in the Middle and Far East.

Bibliography
 Bernard Da Costa Histoire du Café-Théâtre, éditions Buchet-Chastel 1978.

Theatrical genres